Delphine Pelletier (born 16 June 1977 in Bourges) is an athlete from France, who competes in triathlon. Pelletier competed at the second Olympic triathlon at the 2004 Summer Olympics. She is ten times French champion.

References
 Profile

French female triathletes
Triathletes at the 2004 Summer Olympics
1977 births
Living people
Olympic triathletes of France
Sportspeople from Bourges